Egon Miklos Ronay (24 July 1915 – 12 June 2010) was a Hungarian-born food critic who wrote and published a famous series of guides to British and Irish restaurants and hotels in the 1950s and 1960s. These guidebooks are credited with raising the quality of British cuisine offered in public eating places. Ronay also championed foreign cuisine for British diners.

Early life
Born in Budapest, Austria-Hungary, in 1915, he was the son of a prominent restaurateur. With the onset of World War II, he was conscripted into the Hungarian Army and served with the occupying forces after the First and Second Vienna Awards in southern Slovakia and northern Transylvania.

His father's business suffered during wartime, and was taken over by the Communists once Hungary fell under control of the Soviets after the defeat of the Nazis.

Career
Ronay emigrated to London, England alone on 10 October 1946. His father's contacts arranged for him to manage Princes restaurant in Piccadilly, and then the Carousel Club in St James's. He then borrowed £4,000 and took over the 39-seat Marquee, a former tea room, near Harrods, putting classic French dishes on the menu, which was unusual for post-war UK.

The renowned TV chef Fanny Cradock visited with her husband, Johnny, and subsequently Ronay built up useful contacts with the press. After much cajoling, he began to write a food column for The Daily Telegraph.

In his later years, Ronay acted as food consultant for pub chain J D Wetherspoon, visiting outlets in his chauffeur-driven car to ensure the onion rings were sufficiently crispy and the baked potatoes up to standard. He also worked for motorway service station company Welcome Break, promoting their food and drinks.

Egon Ronay's Guide
In 1957, Ronay completed the first edition of the Egon Ronay's Guide to British Eateries, selling 30,000 copies. The guides gained in popularity and it became a mark of distinction to be mentioned in the books. Many restaurants proudly displayed blue roundels in their window saying "EGON RONAY'S GUIDES" for each year they were listed. The guides made a point of not accepting advertising or hospitality from hotels and restaurants to ensure their impartiality.

Ronay sold the rights to his books to the AA in 1985. However, after subsequent owner Leading Guides International went into bankruptcy, in 1997 Ronay went to court to claim back the guides which bore his name. In 2005, in conjunction with the Royal Automobile Club, Ronay brought out Egon Ronay's RAC Guide to the Top 200 Restaurants in the UK, basing the reviews on comments received by restaurant inspectors.

Personal life
Ronay was twice married. His daughter Edina Ronay (b. 1943), is a former actress and fashion designer. Another daughter, Esther, worked as an editor with the BBC and is an independent documentary producer. In various interviews, Ronay steadfastly refused to give his age. He died at his Berkshire home in Yattendon, on 12 June 2010, after a short illness.

References

External links
Interview with Egon Ronay in The Observer newspaper
Chefs pay tribute to 'visionary' Egon Ronay, The Telegraph, 12 June 2010

1915 births
2010 deaths
Writers from Budapest
Hungarian emigrants to England
Hungarian military personnel of World War II
British restaurateurs
British food writers
British restaurant critics